The Renton Public Library is the King County Library System (KCLS) branch library in Renton, Washington, in the United States. It was a city library between its construction in 1966 and 2010, when it was one of the last three non-KCLS members in the county outside of Seattle and it was incorporated into KCLS after what may have been "the most contentious annexation fight in the system's 71 years".

Design and construction
The library sits astride a river – the Cedar River – one of the only libraries in the United States to do so.

Renovation
The library was closed June 22, 2014 for a $10.2 million renovation, to include new pilings into the banks of the Cedar River for seismic retrofitting, and replacement of wall-mounted windows with floor-to-ceiling glass for better river views and natural light. After renovation the library reopened in August, 2015.

For the renovation, Miller Hull Partnership architects were awarded AIA/ALA Library Building Award in 2016, then in 2017 won the American Institute of Architects Seattle chapter's Civic Design Honor Award for its rehabilitation.

Salmon viewing
The library's location over the Cedar River is considered a prime location to view spawning Northwest salmon species including Sockeye, Coho and Chinook.

References

External links

Official website via King County Library System
2017 AIA Seattle Honor Awards Gallery: Renton Library (AIA Seattle)

1966 establishments in Washington (state)
Buildings and structures in Renton, Washington
Crossings of the Cedar River (Washington)
Library buildings completed in 1966
Public libraries in Washington (state)